Lewis Carroll Epstein is the author of layman's books on physics that use an idiosyncratic mix of cartoons and single-page brain teasers to pull the reader into advanced concepts in classical mechanics, quantum theory, and relativity.

His books "Thinking Physics" and "Thinking Physics is Gedanken Physics" have been republished for almost 30 years, the former being on the Exploratorium recommended science reading list.  He credits his teaching style to experience presenting technical testimony to trial juries and congressional hearings. 
Note: Unfortunately, Mr. Epstein does not give any credit to his co-author and the book's illustrator, Paul G. Hewitt.

Bibliography

Non-fiction 
 Thinking Physics is Gedanken Physics (1979)
 Thinking Physics (1981), co-authored with physicist Paul G. Hewitt
Thinking Physics, Understandable Practical Reality, Third Edition (2009 ), author and illustrator Lewis Carroll Epstein 
translated into German by Hans-Erhard Lessing as Denksport-Physik: Fragen und Antworten
 Relativity Visualized (1984), held in over 7000 libraries.
Relativity Visualized "The Gold Nugget of Relativity Books" (2000),
translated into German edition Relativitätstheorie anschaulich dargestellt : Gedankenexperimente, Zeichnungen, Bilder

References

External links
Book Reviews:
 http://relative2charmquark.wordpress.com/2011/04/12/thinking-physics/
 https://web.archive.org/web/20110824105821/http://physicsbookhub.blogspot.com/2011/03/thinking-physics-understandable.html

21st-century American physicists
Living people
Year of birth missing (living people)